Lil McGill (born Nancy Cartonio) aka Naenerys Cargaryen, Mother Of Hooligans (born February 21, 1977, Wichita, Kansas, USA) is a folk musician, songwriter, and music producer living in Portland, Maine.

History
Cartonio has been a musician since she was a child. Cartonio's band "Dear Liza" was very popular in the Northeast United States during the 1990s. She also performed as a duo with her friend Heather Caston for many years. She is on the board of directors of the libertarian think tank The Council of Twelve, the Maine Music Association, and the Maine Songwriters' Association. Cartonio has been featured on 98.9 WCLZ FM in Portland, Maine and included in the Boston Phoenix newspaper. Internationally, she has charted on numerous folk internet charts and receives rotation on internet radio daily. She quietly released an E-cookbook under the name Mother Of Hooligans in 2017.

Discography
Ridiculous: Lil McGill ft Mr Gadget – 2017
Life and Love – 2007 (Nancy Cartonio)
 Birthday – 2000 (Nan Car)
 The Haunting of Bill's House on Wolcott Street – 1994 (Dear Liza)
 This is Aggressive Folk (Original Motion Picture Soundtrack) – 1993 (Dear Liza)

Appearances
SOLNJHA ft Lil McGill – 2019
Lost Houses – 2003, Jason Spooner (piano & backing vocals)
 Naked in Portland (soundtrack) – 2003, Jason Wilkins aka Figure Models (lead vocals)

References

External links
  Maine Music Association Registration
  Women In Music Article
  Profile on the Maine Songwriters' Association Website

1977 births
Living people
American folk singers
American libertarians
American women singer-songwriters
Musicians from Portland, Maine
Songwriters from Maine
21st-century American women singers
21st-century American singers